Titanium Metals Corporation, or  most commonly referred to as TIMET, a shortened version of "TItanium METals" that is a registered company trademark. TIMET, founded in 1950, is an American manufacturer of titanium-based metals products, focusing primarily on the aerospace industry headquartered in Warrensville Heights, Ohio. Its major U.S. operations are based in Morgantown, Pennsylvania; Henderson, Nevada; Vallejo, California;  and Toronto, Ohio. Its overseas operations are primarily based in the United Kingdom (in Waunarlwydd and Witton) and in France (in the village of Ugine).

In September, 2007, TIMET entered into a ten-year supply agreement with United Technologies Corp (UTC). Under the agreement, TIMET would supply titanium to UTC for commercial and military aircraft and aircraft engines.

In November 2012, the company was purchased for $2.9 billion by Precision Castparts Corp.(PCC) and now operates under the PCC Metals Group Division. In January 2016, Precision Castparts Corp. became a subsidiary of Berkshire Hathaway.

References

Titanium companies
Metal companies of the United States
Companies formerly listed on the New York Stock Exchange
Manufacturing companies based in Dallas
Toronto, Ohio
2012 mergers and acquisitions
Berkshire Hathaway
American corporate subsidiaries